KWBQ (channel 19) is a television station licensed to Santa Fe, New Mexico, United States, serving the Albuquerque area as a de facto owned-and-operated station of The CW. The station's transmitter is located atop Sandia Crest. KWBQ is owned by Mission Broadcasting alongside MyNetworkTV affiliate KASY-TV (channel 50). The two stations share studios with dual CBS/Fox affiliate KRQE (channel 13) on Broadcast Plaza in Albuquerque. Nexstar Media Group, which owns KRQE and holds a majority stake in The CW, provides master control, technical, engineering and accounting services for KWBQ and KASY-TV through a shared services agreement (SSA), though the two stations are otherwise operated separately from KRQE as Mission handles programming, advertising sales and retransmission consent negotiations.

KRWB-TV (channel 21) in Roswell operates as a satellite of KWBQ, extending its signal across southeastern New Mexico. This station's transmitter is located near Hagerman. KRWB is a straight simulcast of KWBQ; on-air references to KRWB are limited to Federal Communications Commission (FCC)-mandated hourly station identifications during programming. Besides the transmitter, KRWB does not maintain any physical presence in Roswell. Unlike its parent station, KRWB does not carry any of KWBQ's subchannels, but does carry KASY-TV on its second subchannel.

History
KWBQ commenced operations on March 5, 1999, as an affiliate of The WB, bringing that network's programming back to the market two years after then-UPN affiliate KASY-TV dropped its secondary affiliation with the network after a two-year run in 1997. The station was originally branded as "WB19" at sign-on, before it was later changed to "New Mexico's WB" in 2002. ACME Communications would purchase KASY from Ramar Communications in June 1999, a deal that resulted in the formation of Albuquerque's first major television duopoly and the termination of KASY's local marketing agreement with Lee Enterprises (then-owners of CBS affiliate KRQE). In February 2003, KWBQ signed on Roswell-licensed satellite station KRWB-TV on UHF channel 21 to extend KWBQ's broadcast signal into southeastern New Mexico. This partially filled a gap that was created in January 2002 when the network's El Paso affiliate, KKWB, switched its affiliation to TeleFutura; as a result, the network's programming would only be available on cable in the El Paso market via Los Angeles superstation KTLA for the remainder of its run.

On January 24, 2006, Time Warner's Warner Bros. Entertainment unit and CBS Corporation announced that the two companies would merge the operations of The WB and UPN, which the companies respectively owned, into a joint venture called The CW Television Network. On March 9 of that year, ACME Communications signed an affiliation agreement with the network for KWBQ and its KRWB satellite to join The CW upon the network's September 18 launch, while KASY would join another new service, the Fox Entertainment Group-owned MyNetworkTV, upon its September 5, 2006, launch. The deals made ACME the third station group, after Capitol Broadcasting Company (WJZY-WMYT-TV/Charlotte) and Weigel Broadcasting (WCWW-LP-WMYS-LP/South Bend) to have duopolies affiliated with both The CW and MyNetworkTV. In September 2006, KWBQ/KRWB was rebranded as "New Mexico's CW" to reflect their new affiliation. At that time, the station created a new mascot dubbed "The CW Guy" (designed basically as an anthropomorphic television with arms and legs and The CW's logo on its screen) to serve as a promotional tool at local station events; "The CW Guy" served as a replacement for The WB's former mascot Michigan J. Frog.

On June 4, 2010, ACME announced it would enter into a shared services agreement (SSA) with LIN Media; as a result, LIN's own duopoly of KASA-TV and KRQE would provide technical, engineering and accounting services for KWBQ and KASY, with the mutual operating costs shared in order to help reduce overall costs for ACME.

On September 10, 2012, ACME announced a proposed sale of KASY-TV as well as KWBQ (and its Roswell repeater, KRWB-TV) to Tamer Media, a company founded by broadcast industry veteran John S. Viall, Jr. The $17.3 million sale, which the FCC approved on November 21, and was completed on December 11, gave Tamer Media its first TV properties, while ACME is making its exit from the station ownership business (the three stations are the last portions of ACME's TV station portfolio). The stations' shared services agreement with LIN Media will continue under new ownership.

On March 21, 2014, Media General announced that it would purchase LIN Media and its stations, including KRQE, KASA-TV, and the SSA with KWBQ/KRWB-TV and KASY-TV, in a $1.6 billion merger. The merger was completed on December 19. Just over a year later, on January 27, 2016, it was announced that the Nexstar Broadcasting Group would buy Media General for $4.6 billion. The sale was completed on January 17, 2017.

On August 7, 2020, it was announced that Mission Broadcasting would acquire KWBQ and its satellites and KASY-TV from Tamer Media. The sale was completed on November 16.

Programming

Syndicated programming
Syndicated programs seen on KWBQ include Mom, The Goldbergs, The Big Bang Theory, Two and a Half Men, How I Met Your Mother, Modern Family, Right This Minute, Seinfeld and The King of Queens.

Newscasts
Starting in April 2015, KWBQ began to simulcast KRQE's morning newscast, including the later Fox New Mexico half of the show, from 4:30–9 a.m. It airs the Fox New Mexico (KRQE-DT2) program New Mexico Living from 10–11 a.m.

Technical information
The stations' digital signals are multiplexed:

KWBQ has not carried any subchannels in past years but on January 11, 2016, the station added the action/western channel Grit and comedy channel Laff from Katz Broadcasting. Laff further adds to KWBQ's identity as a station for comedy while Grit and Ion add some programming diversity to the signal. KWBQ further added Ion Television to 19.4 on January 18, 2017, due to the January 2017 sale of KASA-TV to Ramar Communications, as well as the switch in Fox affiliation over to KRQE. On September 1, 2021, KWBQ is adding Nexstar-owned Rewind TV as KWBQ's fifth subchannel.

Analog-to-digital conversion
Both stations shut down their analog signals, respectively on June 12, 2009, the official date in which full-power television stations in the United States transitioned from analog to digital broadcasts under federal mandate. 
 KWBQ shut down its analog signal, over UHF channel 19; the station's digital signal remained on its pre-transition UHF channel 29. Through the use of PSIP, digital television receivers display the station's virtual channel as its former UHF analog channel 19. 
 KRWB-TV shut down its analog signal, over UHF channel 21, and "flash-cut" its digital signal into operation UHF channel 21.

As part of the SAFER Act, KWBQ kept its analog signal on the air until June 26 to inform viewers of the digital television transition through a loop of public service announcements from the National Association of Broadcasters.

References

External links 
 

The CW affiliates
Grit (TV network) affiliates
Laff (TV network) affiliates
Rewind TV affiliates
Ion Television affiliates
Television channels and stations established in 1999
WBQ
Mass media in Santa Fe, New Mexico
Mass media in Albuquerque, New Mexico
Nexstar Media Group
1999 establishments in New Mexico